Anja Wicker (born 22 December 1991) is a German handicapped cross-country skier and biathlete. She represented Germany at the 2014 Winter Paralympics claiming a gold and a silver medal in the biathlon events. She also represented Germany at the 2018 and 2022 Winter Paralympics.

Wicker was also the recipient of the Silver Laurel Leaf, the highest sport award in Germany.

Career 
Anja Wicker took the sport of Nordic skiing in 2006 and started to compete in international arena from 2010. She was qualified to compete at the 2014 Winter Paralympics, which was her maiden Paralympic event and participated in the cross-country skiing and biathlon events. She claimed her first gold medal in the women's 10km sitting biathlon event and also clinched a silver medal at the 2014 Winter Paralympics in the women's 12.5km sitting biathlon event while the gold medal was claimed by Svetlana Konovalova of Russia in the relevant event.

She won the gold medal in the women's 6km sitting biathlon event at the 2021 World Para Snow Sports Championships held in Lillehammer, Norway. She also won the bronze medal in the women's 7.5km sitting cross-country skiing event.

References

External links 
 
 

1991 births
Living people
German female biathletes
German female cross-country skiers
Paralympic biathletes of Germany
Paralympic cross-country skiers of Germany
Paralympic gold medalists for Germany
Paralympic silver medalists for Germany
Paralympic bronze medalists for Germany
Paralympic medalists in biathlon
Cross-country skiers at the 2014 Winter Paralympics
Biathletes at the 2014 Winter Paralympics
Biathletes at the 2018 Winter Paralympics
Biathletes at the 2022 Winter Paralympics
Medalists at the 2014 Winter Paralympics
Medalists at the 2022 Winter Paralympics
Recipients of the Silver Laurel Leaf
Sportspeople from Stuttgart
20th-century German women
21st-century German women